Syed Muhammad Shah Noorani is the current spiritual leader of the Sofia Imamia Noorbakshia Order of Sufism.

Early life 
He was born in Khaplu in 1951. He got his early Islamic education from his father and received further education from Al Haaj Syed Ali Shah (a well known Muslim scholar).He remained member of Northern areas council from 11 October 1979 to 1983.He became to supreme leader(peer) of Noorbakhshia after the death of his father Syed Aun Ali Shah Aun-ul-Momineen on 8 November 1991.

References 

1951 births
People from Gilgit-Baltistan
Living people
Pakistani Sufis
People from Ghanche District
Balti people